United States lightship Columbia (WLV-604) is a lightship located in Astoria, Oregon, United States of America. Columbia was formerly moored near the mouth of the Columbia River.

History
Commissioned in 1951, Columbia was the fourth and final lightship stationed at the mouth of the Columbia River. Built by Rice Brothers Shipyard in Boothbay, Maine, Columbia was launched with her sister-ship, Relief (WLV-605). The new WLV-604 replaced the aging vessel LV-93, which had been in service on the Columbia River since 1939.  From 1892 until 1979, the Columbia River lightships guided vessels across the Columbia River Bar and an area known as the Graveyard of the Pacific. Columbia was the final lightship to be decommissioned on the U.S. West coast. She was replaced by an automated navigational buoy soon after. The buoy has since been retired.

Because of its importance, the Coast Guard had a permanent 18 man crew stationed on board, consisting of 17 enlisted men and one warrant officer who served as ship's captain. Everything the crew needed had to be on board. In the winter, weeks of rough weather prevented any supplies from being delivered. Life on board the lightship was marked by long stretches of monotony and boredom intermixed with riding gale-force storms. The crew worked two to four week rotations, with ten men on duty at all times.

In 1978, Columbia was added to the National Register of Historic Places. It was removed from the Register in 1983 due to relocation from its historic location. She was returned to the Register in 1989 when she was declared a National Historic Landmark, listed under the name Lightship WAL-604, "Columbia". WLV-604 is now located at the Columbia River Maritime Museum, alongside the navigational buoy that replaced her in 1979.

See also 
 List of lighthouses on the Oregon Coast
 Columbia Bar

References

External links

 Sunset Empire Amateur Radio Club station: W7BU, Lightship COLUMBIA museum.
 
 National Historic Landmark Nomination for Lightship Columbia

1950 ships
Columbia River
Historic American Engineering Record in Oregon
Lightships of the United States
Museum ships in Oregon
Museums in Astoria, Oregon
National Historic Landmark lighthouses
National Historic Landmarks in Oregon
National Register of Historic Places in Astoria, Oregon
Ships built in Boothbay, Maine
Ships on the National Register of Historic Places in Oregon
Ships built by Rice Brothers Corporation